Ana Belén Montes (born February 28, 1957) is a former American senior analyst at the Defense Intelligence Agency in the United States who spied on behalf of the Cuban government for 17 years.

On September 21, 2001, Montes was arrested and subsequently charged with conspiracy to commit espionage for the government of Cuba. Montes pleaded guilty to spying and in October 2002, was sentenced to a 25-year prison term followed by five years' probation. She was released on January 6, 2023, after serving 20 years.

Early life and career
Montes was born in Nuremberg, in what was then West Germany, where her father, Alberto Montes, was posted as a United States Army doctor. Her family originated from the Asturian region in Spain, and her grandparents had immigrated to Puerto Rico. The family later lived in Topeka, Kansas, and then Towson, Maryland, where she graduated from Loch Raven High School in 1975. In 1979 she earned a degree in foreign affairs from the University of Virginia, and in 1988 she finished a master's degree at Johns Hopkins University School of Advanced International Studies.

Montes' brother and sister, Tito and Lucy, became Federal Bureau of Investigation employees. Tito was an FBI special agent, and Lucy was a longtime FBI language analyst and translator. Her sister played a key role in Montes' identification as a Cuban mole. Ana Montes' former boyfriend, Roger Corneretto, was an intelligence officer specializing in Cuba for the Pentagon.

Montes joined the Defense Intelligence Agency (DIA) in September 1985 after working for the United States Department of Justice. Her first assignment was at Bolling Air Force Base in Washington where she worked as an intelligence research specialist. In 1992, Montes was selected for the DIA's Exceptional Analyst Program and later traveled to Cuba to study the Cuban military.

Prior to her arrest, she lived in a two bedroom co-op apartment in the Cleveland Park neighborhood of Washington, D.C.

Montes advanced rapidly through the ranks at the DIA and became its most senior Cuban analyst. Her co-workers regarded her as responsible and dependable, and noted her "no-nonsense" attitude. Prosecutors would later allege that Montes was already working for the Cubans when she joined the DIA in 1985.

Espionage
Montes had been recruited by Cuban intelligence while she was a university student at Johns Hopkins University in the 1980s. She became known to other students for her strong opinions in support of left-wing Latin American movements like the Sandinista National Liberation Front in Nicaragua. A Cuban agent eventually approached her. After recruiting her, the Cuban Intelligence Service groomed her to pursue employment with the Defense Intelligence Agency.

In their charging documents, federal prosecutors stated:

The prosecutors further stated that all of the information was on water-soluble paper that could be rapidly destroyed.

During the course of the investigation against her, it was determined that Montes had passed a considerable amount of classified information to the Cuban Intelligence Directorate, including the identities of four US spies in Cuba. In 2007, American DIA counterintelligence official Scott W. Carmichael publicly alleged that it was Ana Montes who told Cuban intelligence officers about a clandestine US Army camp in El Salvador. Carmichael alleged that Montes knew about the existence of the Special Forces camp because she visited it only a few weeks before the camp was attacked in 1987 by Cuban-supported guerrillas of the Farabundo Martí National Liberation Front (FMLN).

Carmichael, who had led the DIA investigation of Montes, named her as being directly responsible for the death of Green Beret Sergeant Gregory A. Fronius who was killed at El Paraíso, El Salvador, on March 31, 1987, during the FMLN attack. Carmichael characterized the damage Montes caused to the DIA and other US intelligence agencies as "exceptionally grave," and stated that she compromised a "special access program" that was kept even from him, the lead investigator on her case.

Carmichael further alleged that, unlike many in the US intelligence community, he believed that Montes' penetration of the DIA was not the exception, but the rule, and that the Cuban intelligence services had multiple spies and moles within US intelligence agencies.

In 2004 a federal indictment alleged that Montes had assistance from another Cuban agent, Marta Rita Velázquez, once a legal officer at the United States Agency for International Development, who was further alleged to have recruited Montes into espionage. The federal indictment was unsealed in April 2013. Velázquez has been outside the US since 2002, apparently in Sweden, which does not have an extradition treaty with the US for spy cases.

Arrest
Montes was arrested by the Federal Bureau of Investigation at her office on September 21, 2001. Prosecutors stated that Montes had been privy to classified information about the US military's impending invasion of Afghanistan in October 2001, and that they did not want her revealing this information to potential enemies.

In 2002, Montes pleaded guilty to the charge which could have carried the death penalty, but was sentenced to 25 years in prison in October of the same year after accepting a plea agreement with the US government. Her lawyer, Plato Cacheris, said that Montes spied for Cuba because "she felt the Cubans were treated unfairly by the U.S. government." After pleading guilty, Montes told CIA debriefers that she desired to protect Cuba from the U.S. and that she believed that "all the world is one country." In a 2013 letter from prison to a friend, Montes wrote that "I believe that the morality of espionage is relative. The activity always betrays someone, and some observers will think that it is justified and others not, in every case."

Incarceration

Montes was incarcerated at FMC Carswell in Fort Worth, Texas. FMC Carswell is listed by the Federal Bureau of Prisons as a facility located in the northeast corner of the Naval Air Station, Joint Reserve Base, Fort Worth, which provides specialized medical and mental health services to female offenders.

Montes is listed as FMC Register #25037-016. She was released on January 6, 2023. Having been released, she will be monitored, including her internet usage, for five years. Montes will not be allowed to contact "foreign agents" or work for the US government "without permission".

She is currently living in Puerto Rico and continues to speak out against the US sanctions against Cuba.

See also
 Kendall Myers

Further reading

 
 
 
 
 Undersecretary of State John Bolton, CBS News interview, May 11, 2002

References

Incarcerated spies
Analysts of the Defense Intelligence Agency
Paul H. Nitze School of Advanced International Studies alumni
University of Virginia alumni
Cuba–United States relations
1957 births
Living people
American prisoners and detainees
Prisoners and detainees of the United States federal government
American people convicted of spying for Cuba
People from Cleveland Park
American people of Asturian descent
Women spies